Candiru (Vandellia cirrhosa), also known as cañero, toothpick fish, or vampire fish, is a species of parasitic freshwater catfish in the family Trichomycteridae native to the Amazon Basin where it is found in the countries of Bolivia, Brazil, Colombia, Ecuador, and Peru.

The definition of candiru differs between authors. The word has been used to refer to only Vandellia cirrhosa, the entire genus Vandellia, the subfamily Vandelliinae, or even the two subfamilies Vandelliinae and Stegophilinae.

These smaller species are known for an alleged tendency to invade and parasitise the human urethra; however, despite ethnological reports dating back to the late 19th century, the first documented case of the removal of a candiru from a human urethra did not occur until 1997, and even that incident has remained a matter of controversy.

Description
Candirus are small fish. Each has a rather small head and a belly that can appear distended, especially after a large blood meal. The body is translucent, making it quite difficult to spot in the turbid waters of its home. There are short sensory barbels around the head, together with short, backward pointing spines on the gill covers.

Location and habitat

Candirus (Vandellia) inhabit the Amazon and Orinoco basins of lowland Amazonia, where they constitute part of the Neotropical fish fauna. Candirus are hematophagous and parasitize the gills of larger Amazonian fishes, especially catfish of the family Pimelodidae (Siluriformes).

Alleged attacks on humans
Although lurid anecdotes of attacks on humans abound, very few cases have been verified, and some alleged traits of the fish have been discredited as myth or superstition.

Historical accounts
The earliest published report of candiru attacking a human host comes from German biologist C. F. P. von Martius in 1829, who never actually observed it, but rather was told about it by the native people of the area, including that men would tie ligatures around their penises while going into the river to prevent this from happening. Other sources also suggest that other tribes in the area used various forms of protective coverings for their genitals while bathing, though it was also suggested that these were to prevent bites from piranha. Martius also speculated that the fish were attracted by the "odor" of urine. Later experimental evidence has shown this to be false, as the fish actually hunt by sight and have no attraction to urine at all.

Another report from French naturalist Francis de Castelnau in 1855 relates an allegation by local Araguay fisherman, saying that it is dangerous to urinate in the river as the fish "springs out of the water and penetrates into the urethra by ascending the length of the liquid column." While Castelnau himself dismissed this claim as "absolutely preposterous," and the fluid mechanics of such a maneuver defy the laws of physics, it remains one of the more stubborn myths about the candiru. It has been suggested this claim evolved out of the real observation that certain species of fish in the Amazon will gather at the surface near the point where a urine stream enters, having been attracted by the noise and agitation of the water.

In 1836, Eduard Poeppig documented a statement by a local physician in Pará, known only as Dr. Lacerda, who offered an eyewitness account of a case where a candiru had entered a human orifice. However, it was lodged in a native woman's vagina, rather than a male urethra. He relates that the fish was extracted after external and internal application of the juice from a Xagua plant (believed to be a name for Genipa americana). Another account was documented by biologist George A. Boulenger from a Brazilian physician, named Dr. Bach, who had examined a man and several boys whose penises had been amputated. Bach believed this was a remedy performed because of parasitism by candiru, but he was merely speculating as he did not speak his patients' language. American biologist Eugene Willis Gudger noted that the area which the patients were from did not have candiru in its rivers, and suggested the amputations were much more likely the result of having been attacked by piranha.

In 1891, naturalist Paul Le Cointe provides a rare first-hand account of a candiru entering a human body, and like Lacerda's account, it involved the fish being lodged in the vaginal canal, not the urethra. Le Cointe actually removed the fish himself, by pushing it forward to disengage the spines, turning it around and removing it head-first.

Gudger, in 1930, noted there have been several other cases reported wherein the fish entered the vaginal canal, but not a single case of a candiru entering the anus was ever documented. According to Gudger, this lends credence to the unlikelihood of the fish entering the male urethra, based on the comparatively small opening that would accommodate only the most immature members of the species.

Modern cases
To date, there is only one documented case of a candiru entering a human urethra, which took place in Itacoatiara, Brazil, in 1997. In this incident, the victim (a 23-year-old man known only as "F.B.C.") claimed a candiru "jumped" from the water into his urethra as he urinated while thigh-deep in a river. After traveling to Manaus on October 28, 1997, the victim underwent a two-hour urological surgery by Dr. Anoar Samad to remove the fish from his body.

In 1999, American marine biologist Stephen Spotte traveled to Brazil to investigate this particular incident in detail. He recounts the events of his investigation in his book Candiru: Life and Legend of the Bloodsucking Catfishes. Spotte met Dr. Samad in person and interviewed him at his practice and home. Samad gave him photos, the original VHS tape of the cystoscopy procedure, and the actual fish's body preserved in formalin as his donation to the INPA. Spotte and his colleague Paulo Petry took these materials and examined them at the INPA, comparing them with Samad's formal paper. While Spotte did not overtly express any conclusions as to the veracity of the incident, he did remark on several observations that were suspicious about the claims of the patient and/or Samad himself.

 According to Samad, the patient claimed "the fish had darted out of the water, up the urine stream, and into his urethra." While this is the most popularly known legendary trait of the candiru, according to Spotte it has been known conclusively to be a myth for more than a century, as it is impossible because of simple fluid physics.
 The documentation and specimen provided indicate a fish that was 133.5 mm in length and had a head with a diameter of 11.5 mm. This would have required significant force to pry the urethra open to this extent. The candiru has no appendages or other apparatus that would have been necessary to accomplish this, and if it were leaping out of the water as the patient claimed, it would not have had sufficient leverage to force its way inside.
 Samad's paper claims the fish must have been attracted by the urine. This belief about the fish has been held for centuries, but was discredited in 2001. While this was merely speculation on Samad's part based on the prevailing scientific knowledge at the time, it somewhat erodes the patient's story by eliminating the motivation for the fish to have attacked him in the first place.
 Samad claimed the fish had "chewed" its way through the ventral wall of the urethra into the patient's scrotum. Spotte notes that the candiru does not possess the right teeth or strong enough dentition to have been capable of this.
 Samad claimed he had to snip the candiru's grasping spikes off in order to extract it, yet the specimen provided had all its spikes intact.
 The cystoscopy video depicts traveling into a tubular space (presumed to be the patient's urethra) containing the fish's carcass and then pulling it out backwards through the urethral opening, something that would have been almost impossible with the fish's spikes intact.

When subsequently interviewed, Spotte stated that even if a person were to urinate while "submerged in a stream where candiru live", the odds of that person being attacked by candiru are "(a)bout the same as being struck by lightning while simultaneously being eaten by a shark."

In pop culture 
In 21st episode of 3rd season of Grey's Anatomy, a man is admitted to a hospital with a candiru fish in his urethra.

References

Citations

General sources

External links 

 

Catfish of South America
Fish of the Amazon basin
Fish described in 1846
Fish of Bolivia
Freshwater fish of Brazil
Freshwater fish of Colombia
Freshwater fish of Ecuador
Freshwater fish of Peru
Parasites of fish
Parasitic vertebrates
Taxa named by Achille Valenciennes
Trichomycteridae